Aboureihan Educational Complex (Persian: مجتمع آموزشی ابوریحان) is a high school and middle school complex located in Qeitarie district, Saba Blvd. northern Tehran, Iran. Founded in 1991, it is named after Abū Rayḥān Muḥammad-ebne Aḥmad Biruni (Persian: ابوریحان محمد بن احمد بیرونی), an 11th-century Persian scholar, philosopher, and polymath from the province Khwarazm (today Turkmenistan, Uzbekistan, and parts of Kazakhstan). The school emphasizes experimental and mathematical disciplines throughout the high school education. Aboureihan high school is considered one of the most prestigious schools for girls in Iran (as all of the schools are single-sex).

To become a student at Aboureihan, students go through a competitive selection process including an entrance exam that examines their skills in Algebra, Physics, Chemistry, and Biology. Additionally, the participants must have an elementary school GPA of at least 19 out of 20. The difficulty level of the entrance exam requires attendants to start preparing a year prior to taking it. The acceptance rate is 2 percent (around 60 students are accepted from the pool of approximately 3000 participants).
Therefore, Aboureihan students have a reputation for being hardworking and of high intellectual capacity. 

During the year the students have to take a series of exams every day to ensure superior performance. Hence, the school has maintained a brilliant record of students' performance in the Iran University Entrance Exam (also known as the Concours).

Official page

High schools in Iran
Schools in Tehran
Educational institutions established in 1991
1991 establishments in Iran